The Uptown Theater, known as The Uptown (formerly Cineplex Odeon Uptown or AMC Loews Uptown 1), was a single-screen movie theater in the Cleveland Park neighborhood of Washington, D.C. Opened in 1936, it hosted the world premieres of such movies as 2001: A Space Odyssey and Jurassic Park. It closed in March 2020.

Its screen was the largest commercial movie theater screen in the DC Metro area outside of the Smithsonian Institution.  The building was listed on the National Register of Historic Places in 2022.

History
Opened on October 29, 1936, the theater was designed by architect John Jacob Zink, whose firm designed over 200 theaters across the United States, and the 14th built by Warner Brothers in Washington, D.C. The exterior is constructed of yellow and red brick and the facade is partially faced in limestone fluted panels. The limestone features typical Art Deco motifs, including zigzag patterns and floral reliefs. The marquee includes streamlined aluminum bands. The main entrance to the theater is below this marquee. Two one-story storefronts flank the theater entrances. 

The theater originally seated 1,120, but a $500,000 renovation in 1996 decreased capacity to 850. Nothing remains of the original decor. 

In December 2010, the theater's Norelco 35mm/70mm projector was dismantled and replaced with a Christie Dual-Projector 3D system for the opening of Tron: Legacy.

In March 2020, AMC Theatres announced the closing of the 84-year-old theater, as AMC's lease on the space was about to expire. Unlike many temporary closures that hit the D.C. region in 2020, the closure of the Uptown Theater is permanent and does not seem connected to the COVID-19 pandemic.

In October 2021, officials with Landmark Theaters confirmed reports that they were in negotiations to lease and reopen the theater.

In May 2022, the D.C. government's Historic Preservation Review Board voted 7-0 to add the theater to the D.C. Inventory of Historic Sites and to nominate it for addition to the National Register of Historic Places. In December 2022, the NRHP listed it among the week's additions.

Film premieres

 World premiere of 2001: A Space Odyssey on April 2, 1968. The release was presented in a 70mm projection format with a six-track stereo magnetic soundtrack. Following this screening, director Stanley Kubrick cut almost 20 minutes from the film's running time.
 One of the first 32 houses to play Star Wars on its opening day (Wednesday, May 25, 1977) in 35 mm with a 4-track stereo soundtrack. The theater also started playing the film in the 70 mm projection format with a 6-track Dolby Stereo magnetic soundtrack on December 16 of the same year.
 Mississippi Burning held its world premiere at the Uptown on December 2, 1988, with various politicians, ambassadors and political reporters in attendance. 
 Madonna attended the world premiere of Dick Tracy on June 10, 1990.
 World premiere of Jurassic Park on June 9, 1993.
 On October 3, 1979, one of only three theaters to screen director Francis Ford Coppola's Apocalypse Now in Six-Track Dolby Stereo, which showcased a then-new quintaphonic split-surround audio mix. The film was shown without opening or closing credits or any studio logos; instead, a program was handed out to moviegoers.
 World premiere of Dances with Wolves on October 19, 1990. During the screening, the projector broke down twice.
 The Guardian, starring Kevin Costner and Ashton Kutcher, on September 7, 2006.
 Lions for Lambs, starring Robert Redford, Tom Cruise, and Meryl Streep and directed by Redford, on November 7, 2007.

External links

References

Cinemas and movie theaters in Washington, D.C.
Cleveland Park
Landmarks in Washington, D.C.
1936 establishments in Washington, D.C.
Theatres completed in 1936
Art Deco architecture in Washington, D.C.